Vynohradove is a village (selo) in southern Ukraine, located in Kherson Raion, Kherson Oblast. Before 1946, it was named Chalbasy. It has a population of 4636 people.

Administrative status 
Until July 2020, Vynohradove was in the Oleshky Raion of Kherson Oblast. The raion was abolished in July 2020 as a result of the administrative reform of Ukraine's districts, which reduced the number of raions of Kherson Oblast to five, merging Oleshky Raion into Kherson Raion.

History 
Before then, Chalbasy had been the site of a former Tatar settlement.

The location in the steppes in which the village was built was "waterless". The punishment for digging a well occasionally included hard labor. After a few years, residents eventually discovered a natural well in the wilderness. The prohibition on digging wells was only lifted by the beginning of the 19th century. By 1799, Chalbasy had 1,139 inhabitants, of whom 622 were men and 517 were women.

By 1886, 4788 people lived in the village, which also contained an Orthodox church and a school.

During the Holodomor, 195 people in the village died.

Demographics 
According to the 2001 Ukrainian census, the native languages of the inhabitants were:

References 

Villages in Kherson Raion
Webarchive template wayback links